The Hymn of the Pearl (also Hymn of the Soul, Hymn of the Robe of Glory or Hymn of Judas Thomas the Apostle) is a passage of the apocryphal Acts of Thomas. In that work, originally written in Syriac, the Apostle Thomas sings the hymn while praying for himself and fellow prisoners. Some scholars believe the hymn predates the Acts, as it only appears in one Syriac manuscript and one Greek manuscript of the Acts of Thomas. The author of the Hymn is unknown, though there is a belief that it was composed by the Syriac gnostic Bardaisan from Edessa due to some parallels between his life and that of the hymn. It is believed to have been written in the 2nd century or even possibly the 1st century, and shows influences from heroic folk epics from the region.

Synopsis
The hymn tells the story of a boy, "the son of the king of kings", who is sent to Egypt to retrieve a pearl from a serpent. During the quest, he is seduced by Egyptians and forgets his origin and his family. However, a letter is sent from the king of kings to remind him of his past. When the boy receives the letter, he remembers his mission, retrieves the pearl and returns. That the boy is implicitly Thomas rather than Jesus is indicated by the eventual assertion that he is next in line to his elder brother, this unnamed brother not otherwise mentioned in the text.

Interpretation
The hymn is commonly interpreted as a Gnostic view of the human condition, that we are spirits lost in a world of matter and forgetful of our true origin.  This state of affairs may be ameliorated by a revelatory message delivered by a messenger, a role generally ascribed to Jesus. The letter thus takes on a symbolic representation of gnosis.

The hymn has been preserved and especially treasured in Manichaeism – a version of it appears as part of a Coptic Manichaean psalm book and is called the Psalms of Thomas. The Hymn of the Pearl has also been admired by Orthodox Christian thinkers and members of the Church of Jesus Christ of Latter-Day Saints (Mormons).

Extracts from the text
The following text is from Wikisource, which contains the full text of the hymn.

References

Further reading
 Barnstone, Willis; Meyer, Marvin (2005). The Gnostic Bible: Gnostic Texts of Mystical Wisdom from the Ancient and Medieval Worlds Shambhala Publications, Boston MA. . pp. 386–394.
 Myers, Susan E. (2010). Spirit Epicleses in the Acts of Thomas. Mohr Siebeck, . pp. 71–74.

External links 

 Hymn of the Pearl
 Audio with commentary
 Audio of the Hymn of the Pearl translated and read by Willis Barnstone
 Chiastic outline of Hymn of the Robe of Glory

2nd-century Christian texts
Texts in Syriac
Gnostic texts
New Testament apocrypha
Pearls in religion